is Morning Musume's 70th single.

Information 
This was the last single to feature 10th generation member Masaki Satou.

Featured lineup 

 9th generation: Mizuki Fukumura, Erina Ikuta
 10th generation: Ayumi Ishida, Masaki Sato
 11th generation: Sakura Oda
 12th generation: Miki Nonaka, Maria Makino, Akane Haga
 13th generation: Kaede Kaga, Reina Yokoyama
 14th generation: Chisaki Morito
 15th th generation: Rio Kitagawa, Homare Okamura, Mei Yamazaki

Teenage Solution Vocalists

Main Voc: Mizuki Fukumura, Masaki Sato, Sakura Oda

Center Voc: Miki Nonaka, Maria Makino, Kaede Kaga, Rio Kitagawa, Mei Yamazaki

Minor Voc: Erina Ikuta, Ayumi Ishida,  Akane Haga,  Reina Yokoyama, Chisaki Morito, Homare Okamura

Yoshi Yoshi Shite Hoshii no Vocalists

Main Voc: Mizuki Fukumura, Masaki Sato, Sakura Oda

Minor Voc: Erina Ikuta, Ayumi Ishida, Miki Nonaka, Maria Makino, Akane Haga, Kaede Kaga, Reina Yokoyama, Chisaki Morito, Rio Kitagawa, Homare Okamura, Mei Yamazaki

Beat no Wakusei Vocalist

Main Voc: Ayumi Ishida, Miki Nonaka, Kaede Kaga

Center Voc: Mizuki Fukumura, Erina Ikuta, Masaki Sato, Akane Haga,   Reina Yokoyama, Chisaki Morito, Rio Kitagawa, Homare Okamura, Mei Yamazaki

Minor Voc: Sakura Oda, Maria Makino

Track listing

CD

Limited Editions A-C, SP2, Regular Editions 
Teenage Solution
Yoshi Yoshi Shite Hoshii no
Beat no Wakusei
Teenage Solution (Instrumental)
Yoshi Yoshi Shite Hoshii no (Instrumental)
Beat no Wakusei (Instrumental)

Limited Edition SP1 
Teenage Solution
Yoshi Yoshi Shite Hoshii no
Beat no Wakusei
Joshi Kashimashi Monogatari (Morning Musume '21 Ver.)
Teenage Solution (Instrumental)
Yoshi Yoshi Shite Hoshii no (Instrumental)
Beat no Wakusei (Instrumental)
Joshi Kashimashi Monogatari (Morning Musume '21 Ver.) (Instrumental)

Limited Edition A Blu-ray 
Teenage Solution (Music Video)
Teenage Solution (Dance Shot Ver.)
Teenage Solution (Making Video)

Limited Edition B Blu-ray 
Yoshi Yoshi Shite Hoshii no (Music Video)
Yoshi Yoshi Shite Hoshii no (Dance Shot Ver.)
Yoshi Yoshi Shite Hoshii no (Making Video)

Limited Edition C Blu-ray 
Beat no Wakusei (Close-Up Ver.)
Teenage Solution (feat. Sato Masaki Ver.)
Yoshi Yoshi Shite Hoshii no (feat. Sato Masaki Ver.)

Single V "Beat no Wakusei" 
Beat no Wakusei (Music Video)
Beat no Wakusei (Dance Shot Ver.)
Beat no Wakusei (Dance Shot Ver. II)
Beat no Wakusei (Making Video)

Charts

Oricon
Daily and weekly peak positions

Monthly

Billboard Japan Top Single Sales

References 

Morning Musume songs
2021 singles
Zetima Records singles
Songs written by Tsunku
Hello! Project
Dance-pop songs